Football venues in the Republic of the Congo
Athletics (track and field) venues in the Republic of the Congo
Sports venues in the Republic of the Congo
Congo, Republic of
Stadiums of the African Games
Buildings and structures in Brazzaville
Sports venues completed in 2015
2015 establishments in the Republic of the Congo
Sport in Brazzaville